Vondrka (feminine Vondrková) is a Czech surname. Notable people with the surname include:

 Josef Vondrka (born 1952), Czech volleyball player
 Michal Vondrka (born 1982), Czech ice hockey player
 Šárka Vondrková (born 1976), Czech ice dancer

Czech-language surnames